Ken Pears (12 April 1934 – 18 December 2022) is a former Canadian soccer goalkeeper. He was a four-time national champion with Westminster Royals FC (1953), Vancouver Hale-Co FC (1956), Vancouver Columbus FC (1964), and Vancouver Firefighters FC (1965). He was Canada's starting goalkeeper during FIFA World Cup Qualifiers in 1957. He is an honoured member of the Canada Soccer Hall of Fame as part of the inaugural class in 2000.

In the Pacific Coast League, Pears won seven championships with three clubs: five times with Firefighters (1954–55, 1961–62, 1963–64, 1964–65, 1965–66), once with Westminster Royals FC (1952–53), and once with Hale-Co FC (1958). From 1952 to 1966, he was a British Columbia or Mainland All-Star in 13 of 15 seasons. He notably posted a clean sheet against Tottenham Hotspur in a 2–0 win in Vancouver on 3 June 1957.

He was still just 19 years old when he won his first national title with Westminster Royals in 1953. After they lost the 1952 final to Montréal Stelco and opposing goalkeeper Bill Gill (footballer), Pears and his teammates faced the same all-star goalkeeper a year later now wearing the Montréal Hakoah colours. This time, Pears posted two clean sheets in three matches as the Royals captured the 1953 championship. Across eight inter-provincial matches against Edmonton, Winnipeg and Montréal, Pears posted five clean sheets and conceded just three goals, two of which were scored from the penalty spot.

In 1961–62, Pears won the Austin Delany Memorial Trophy as the league's most valuable player. Along with winning the league championship, the Anderson Cup, and the BC Soccer Province Cup, Pears also helped Firefighters FC win the 1962 Pacific Coast International Championship for the J.K. Kennedy Cup.

Pears also played in the 1964 edition of the Pacific Coast International Championship with the Pacific Coast League all-stars, earning MVP honours as the team finished second. He missed the 1966 edition through injury when Firefighters won their second Kennedy Cup; he won the 1967 edition as a backup goalkeeper (on loan) with Victoria O'Keefe.

In 1969, Pears helped Vancouver Spartans win the Western Canada Soccer League championship.

After representing Canada in FIFA World Cup Qualifiers in 1957, he captained Canada's side during a 1960 tour of the Soviet Union and Britain.

He was inducted into the British Columbia Sports Hall of Fame in 1986.

References

External links
 / Canada Soccer Hall of Fame

1934 births
Living people
Canada men's international soccer players
Canada Soccer Hall of Fame inductees
Canadian soccer players
Soccer players from Vancouver
Association football goalkeepers
Vancouver Columbus players